Marc Slutsky (born in Merrick, New York) is an American drummer who has performed with a wide variety of artists and bands. He was also a founding member of pop-rock band Splender. Slutsky's style has been described as "Diverse; and equally comfortable playing with mellow, introspective songwriters as he is with heavy hitting rock bands." He has built a body of work that place him among the most sought-after live and session players. Marc is currently the touring drummer for Peter Murphy (Bauhaus).

Early life 
Slutsky's drum training took place at the Long Island Drum Center, where he studied with Mike Abbot, Al Miller, and Dave Stark. Slutsky then enrolled in the Manhattan School of Music, studying with the great jazz drummer and educator, John Riley. Slutsky transferred to SUNY Purchase College, where he studied with Kim Plainfield. He received a Bachelors of Fine Arts Degree.

Splender 
Marc Slutsky was a founding member of alternative rock band Splender (1998-2003). The band recorded two albums; 1999's "Halfway Down the Sky" (Columbia Records) produced by Todd Rundgren, and "To Whom it May Concern" produced by Mark Endert on Clive Davis' J Records in 2001. From those albums, the band had two hit singles "I think God Can Explain" and "Yeah Whatever".

Peter Murphy 
Slutsky joined Peter Murphy in April 2018. His first performance with Murphy was on April 21, 2018, at Roxy Fest in Guadalajara. He has worked extensively with Peter including the "40 years of Bauhaus" Ruby World tour featuring David J. Slutsky can be heard on the "Live In London" album that was recorded during that tour at Brixton Academy.

Slutsky continues his collaboration with Peter Murphy, including tours and residency sessions  around the world.

Session and other works 
Marc Slutsky has toured and/or recorded with the following list of artists:

Peter Murphy (Bauhaus) 
David J. (Love and Rockets, Bauhaus)
Kylie Minogue
Lou Gramm (Foreigner)
Mickey Thomas (Jefferson Starship)
Todd Rundgren
Kate Voegele
Terri Nunn (Berlin) 
Tonic
Delta Goodrem
Alexa Ray Joel
Cassadee Pope
Grace Potter
Hugo
Korbee
Drake Bell

In the press 
Slutsky was interviewed by Modern Drummer in 2000 on the Three Deadly Sins

Kit configuration 

Slutsky endorses:

Pork Pie Drums
Paiste cymbals
Remo Heads 
Innovative Percussion sticks

See also 
 List of drummers

References 

Living people
Alternative rock drummers
American alternative rock musicians
American male drummers
21st-century American drummers
Musicians from New York City
Year of birth missing (living people)
21st-century American male musicians